Platzman is a surname. Notable people with the surname include:

Daniel Platzman (born 1986), American musician, songwriter, record producer, and composer
George W. Platzman (1920–2008), American meteorologist